The 1983 Arkansas State Indians football team represented Arkansas State University as a member of the Southland Conference during the 1983 NCAA Division I-AA football season. Led by fifth-year head coach Larry Lacewell, the Indians compiled an overall record of 5–5–1 with a mark of 3–2 in conference play, tying for third place in the Southland.

Schedule

References

Arkansas State
Arkansas State Red Wolves football seasons
Arkansas State Indians football